This article contains information about the literary events and publications of 1646.

Events
March 24 – The King's Men petition Parliament for three-and-a-half years' back pay, even though the London theatres officially remained closed through the middle 1640s. No details of their activities in these years survive.
May 5 – Martin Llewellyn's drama The King Found at Southwell is performed at Oxford; it is the last stage piece presented in the city before its surrender to Parliamentary forces in the English Civil War on June 22–24.
July – John Lilburne is placed in the Tower of London for denouncing his former commander the Earl of Manchester as a traitor.
September 6 – The Biblioteca Palafoxiana is established in Puebla, Mexico, through the donation of books by Bishop Juan de Palafox y Mendoza, perhaps the earliest public library in the American colonies.
unknown dates
Henry Burkhead's closet drama Cola's Fury, or Lirenda's Misery, based on the Irish Rebellion of 1641 ("Lirenda" is an anagram), is published in Kilkenny (dated 1645). Burkhead presents the historical persons involved under pseudonyms: among others, the Earl of Ormonde as "Osiris" and Sir John Borlase as "Berosus".
Jacqueline Pascal is converted to Jansenism, under the influence of her brother, Blaise Pascal.

New books

Prose
Anonymous (John Lilburne?) – London's Liberty in Chains Discovered
Anonymous (John Lilburne?) – Vox Plebis, or the People's Outcry
Sir Thomas Browne Pseudodoxia Epidemica or Vulgar Errors
Thomas Fuller – Andronicus or the Unfortunate Politician
Sir John Suckling – An Account of Religion by Reason published
Vida y hechos de Estebanillo González
Baltasar Gracián – El discreto
Diego de Saavedra Fajardo – Corona gótica, castellana y austríaca

Children
John Cotton – Spiritual Milk for Boston Babes

Drama
Pierre Corneille – Théodore
Jean de Rotrou
Célie
Le Veritable Saint Genest
James Shirley – The Triumph of Beauty (masque)
Sir John Suckling – Fragmenta Aurea, collected plays, including The Sad One (unfinished)

Poetry
Richard Crashaw – Steps to the Temple
Martin Lluelyn – Men-Miracles
John Milton – Poems of Mr. John Milton, Both English and Latin, compos'd at several times (dated 1645, published early 1646)
Francis Quarles – The Shepherds' Oracle
James Shirley – Poems
Henry Vaughan – Poems, with the Tenth Satire of Juvenal Englished

Births
March 19 – Michael Kongehl, German poet (died 1710)
July 1 – Gottfried Leibniz, German mathematician and philosopher (died 1716)
July 20 – Eusèbe Renaudot, French theologian and orientalist (died 1720)
Probable – John Mason, English poet, cleric and hymnist (died 1694)

Deaths
August 19 – Alexander Henderson, Scottish theologian (born c. 1583)
September 17 – Erycius Puteanus, Netherlandish philologist and encyclopedist (born 1574)
October 23 – David Wedderburn, Scottish educationist and schoolbook author (born 1580)
December 23 – François Maynard, French poet (born c. 1582)

References

 
Years of the 17th century in literature